The Wantagh State Parkway is a  long state parkway on Long Island, New York, in the United States. It links the Ocean Parkway in Jones Beach State Park with the Northern State Parkway in Westbury. Construction began in 1927 on this, one of the earliest of the Long Island parkways, with the initial  segment opening two years later as the Jones Beach Causeway, connecting Merrick Road in Wantagh to newly opened Jones Beach State Park. The parkway is inventoried by the New York State Department of Transportation (NYSDOT) as New York State Route 908T (NY 908T), an unsigned reference route.

Route description

The Wantagh State Parkway begins at a traffic circle with the Ocean Parkway in Jones Beach State Park just north of the Atlantic Ocean shoreline. The Parkway proceeds northward as a six-lane divided parkway, passing several large parking lots serving the state park, and soon crossing under Bay Parkway before bending northeast into an unnumbered interchange with the Bay Parkway. The parkway expands to eight lanes as it bends northeast through Jones Beach State Park, intersecting with several u-turn ramps between directions. As the parkway makes a large bend to the northwest, it gains elevation and reduces to five lanes, crossing over the nearby waterway via a bridge. After crossing, the Wantagh State lands on Green Island, bending slightly to the northeast. After Green Island, the parkway crosses the waterway again, landing on Great Island.

The Wantagh State Parkway remains five-lanes across Great Island, crossing west of a bicycle path that follows the northbound lanes before bending northwest over the water once again finally into mainland Long Island. After crossing onto Long Island, the parkway passes west of Cedar Creek County Park in the community of South Wantagh. The parkway soon enters downtown South Wantagh and becomes surrounded with residential homes on side streets, soon entering exit W6. Exit W6 serves as a junction between the Wantagh and Merrick Road. After the interchange, the Wantagh Parkway turns northwest and upgrades to six lanes, crossing over Merrick Road into Millpond County Park. There, the parkway bends northeast, running along the eastern edge of the park into exit W5, which connects the parkway to NY 27 (Sunrise Highway).

After the ramps for exit W5 W, the Wantagh State Parkway continues north through Wantagh, crossing under tracks maintained by the Long Island Rail Road. The parkway now runs along the eastern edge of the Twin Lakes Preserve, passing Seaman Pond as it bends northwest into the Forest Lake section. The parkway passes a large pet cemetery and Wantagh High School before crossing under NY 105 (Jerusalem Avenue). After NY 105, the parkway bends northeast once again, entering exit W4, which connects to the Southern State Parkway. After the Southern State, the Wantagh continues reduces down to four lanes through the community of North Wantagh. The parkway continues northwest, crossing under North Jerusalem Road after leaving North Wantagh.

Now in Levittown, the Wantagh State Parkway passes west of McLaren Memorial Park and continues northeast into an interchange with NY 24 (Hempstead Turnpike), where the parkway becomes four undivided lanes. A short distance later, the parkway crosses under NY 106 (North Newbridge Road). The parkway bends north, passing several transformers before crossing into the town of Oyster Bay. In the town of Oyster Bay, the parkway enters exit W2, which serves Old Country Road right after crossing back into Hempstead. After exit W2, the Wantagh State Parkway continues northwest, crossing over another Long Island Rail Road line into the North Hempstead section. Soon crossing into Jericho Gardens, the parkway proceeds northwest into exit W1, which is an interchange with the Northern State Parkway's exit 33. This interchange serves as the northern terminus of the Wantagh, as its northbound lanes merge into the Northern State.

History
The original section of the parkway, then known as the Jones Beach Causeway, opened on August 4, 1929, along with Jones Beach State Park, running from Merrick Road in Wantagh to Jones Beach Island. The parkway was extended northward to Southern State Parkway in July 1932 and to Northern State Parkway in December 1938. A formerly proposed extension to Interstate 495 (the Long Island Expressway) has been on the books since the late 1950s.

Upon completion of the southern extension of the Seaford–Oyster Bay Expressway (NY 135), Wantagh State Parkway was to be renamed Jones Beach Causeway between NY 135 and Ocean Parkway. Many have erroneously referred to Loop Parkway as the Jones Beach Causeway, most notably in Mario Puzo's 1969 novel The Godfather.

Exit list

References

External links

 Wantagh Parkway (Greater New York Roads)
 

Parkways in New York (state)
Roads on Long Island
Robert Moses projects
Unfinished buildings and structures in the United States
Transportation in Nassau County, New York
Former toll roads in New York (state)
Former toll bridges in New York (state)